Suceveni is a commune in Galați County, Western Moldavia, Romania with a population of 1,819 people. It is composed of two villages, Rogojeni and Suceveni.

Natives
 Spiridon Popescu

References

Communes in Galați County
Localities in Western Moldavia
Populated places on the Prut